Champawat Legislative Assembly constituency is one of the 70 Legislative Assembly constituencies of Uttarakhand state in India. It is a part of Almora Lok Sabha constituency.

Members of the Legislative Assembly 

^ by-poll

Election results

2022 by election 
In the 2022 Uttarakhand Legislative Assembly election, Pushkar Singh Dhami lost from his Khatima seat. In order to continue as the Chief Minister, Dhami had to win as an MLA from another seat, within 6 months. To enable this, Kailash Chandra Gahtori resigned from his seat, and by-elections were called for. Pushkar Singh Dhami won the Champawat by-poll with a record margin of over 55,000 votes.

2022

2017

2012

See also
 List of constituencies of the Uttarakhand Legislative Assembly
 Champawat district

References

External links
 

Champawat district
Assembly constituencies of Uttarakhand